Illuminae is a 2015 young adult space opera epistolary novel written by  Amie Kaufman and Jay Kristoff. This is the first novel  of the series The Illuminae Files. The story is told through a series of documents including classified reports, censored emails, and interviews. Illuminae is set in 2575 and is the story of teenage colonist Kady Grant and her fighter pilot boyfriend Ezra Mason, as they become refugees after becoming caught in a political crossfire.

The series was acquired by Random House in a preempt in 2013. The first book in the series was published in late October 2015. It debuted at #5 on the New York Times Best Seller List Young Adult Hardcover list, and eventually reached the #2 spot.  Illuminae was nominated for the 2016 Prime Minister's Literary Award, won the 2015 Aurealis Award for Best Science Fiction novel, the 2016 Gold Inky Award for best teen fiction, and the 2016 Australian Book Industry Award Book of the Year for Older Children. 

The sequel, Gemina, debuted at #3 on the New York Times bestseller list and won the 2016 Aurealis Award for Best Science Fiction novel.

The third book in the series, Obsidio, debuted at #6 on the New York Times children's series list, as the #1 young adult bestseller in Australia, and as a USA Today bestseller.

An 82-page prequel novella, Memento, was released as a pre-order bonus in the United States for the authors' subsequent unrelated novel Aurora Rising.

Synopsis 
 
The year is 2575, and two rival megacorporations are at war over a planet that’s little more than an ice-covered speck at the edge of the universe. Too bad nobody thought to warn the people living on it. With enemy fire raining down on them, Kady and Ezra—who are barely even talking to each other after almost breaking up—are forced to fight their way onto one of the evacuating fleet, with an enemy warship in hot pursuit.

But their problems are just getting started. A deadly plague has broken out and is mutating, with terrifying results; the fleet’s AI, which should be protecting them, may actually be their enemy; and nobody in charge will say what’s really going on. As Kady hacks into a tangled web of data to find the truth, it’s clear only one person can help her bring it all to light: the ex-boyfriend she swore she’d never speak to again!

Film adaptation 

In November 2015, Brad Pitt's production company, Plan B Entertainment, and Warner Bros. bought the rights to Illuminae.  Pitt, Dede Gardner, and Jeremy Kleiner are set to produce.

Audio adaptation 
The audiobook Illuminae, produced for Penguin Random House, is an Audie Award Winner. It is a full cast audio adaptation rather than a narrated audiobook, and features a cast of twenty starring Olivia Taylor Dudley as Kady Grant, Lincoln Hoppe as AIDAN and Jonathan McCain as Ezra Mason.

References

Space opera novels
2015 Australian novels
2015 science fiction novels
Australian science fiction novels
Epistolary novels
Alfred A. Knopf books
Novels by Jay Kristoff